Burton is a British online clothing retailer and former high street retailer specialising in mens clothing and footwear. The company was a constituent of the FTSE 100 Index, but became a trading name of Arcadia Group Brands Ltd, part of the Arcadia Group. Sir Philip Green acquired the Arcadia Group in 2002, and it became the sole owner of Burton. In 2020, Arcadia went into administration, putting the Burton brand up for sale; in February 2021, Boohoo.com acquired the brand from its administrators. 

There were over 400 stores in the UK.

History

The company was founded by Sir Montague Maurice Burton in Chesterfield in 1903 under the name of The Cross-Tailoring Company. It was first listed on the London Stock Exchange in 1929 by which time it had 400 stores, factories and mills.

After World War II, Montague Burton was one of the suppliers of demob suits to the British government for demobilising servicemen, comprising jacket, trousers, waistcoat, shirt and underwear. It has been speculated that this is the origin of the phrase "the full monty". In 1946, the company acquired the Peter Robinson department store chain. Montague Burton died in 1952. By this time, the company was the largest multiple tailor in the world.

The company expanded by purchasing various other brands, including competitors until it was split from Debenhams in 1998. At this time Burtons became a brand name, and the Arcadia Group name took over as the group name.

The companies purchased or merged with were:

1954Jackson the Tailor
1979Dorothy Perkins
1984Harry Fenton
1985Debenhams
1986John Collier

Burton was the official clothing supplier to the England national football team for the 1966 FIFA World Cup, UEFA Euro 1996 and the 2002 FIFA World Cup championships. In 1998 the company changed its name to Arcadia Group.

Philip Green purchased the company in 2002.

The Burton company archives are held at the West Yorkshire Archive Service in Leeds.

In July 2020, Arcadia Group, which comprised several brands including Burton, had been hit hard by the COVID-19 lockdown and planned hundreds of job cuts to minimise costs. As financial difficulties worsened, Arcadia entered administration on 30 November 2020. In February 2021, Boohoo.com announced it was buying the Burton brand from Arcadia (along with the Wallis and Dorothy Perkins brands) for £25.2 million, with the loss of around 2,450 jobs.

Architecture

Beginning in 1923, Burton began to acquire freehold sites in order to build its own custom designed stores. Prominent town centre corner sites were preferred and the shops often moved a few doors along the same street in order to acquire the corner site. Leeds-based architect Harry Wilson was hired at this time and developed the Burton "house style" building design. In 1931 Burton took over Wilson's practice to make it the in-house architecture department. Wilson was replaced as chief architect by Nathaniel Martin in 1937.

This Burton in-house architecture was Art Deco in style. Individual stores vary from the more restrained red-brick with neoclassical scroll headed columns to fully-fledged Art Deco with glazed white faience tile, geometric patterns and stylised elephant heads. However, there are also many standard elements such as a wide polished black granite band above the shop windows for signage, metal vent grates bearing the company logo, billiard halls on the upper levels, window lights showing the locations of other Burton stores, and mosaic titlessometimes including the company logoin the doorways.

At ground level, foundation stones were often placed by Montague Burton's four children, Barbara, Stanley, Arnold and Raymond. Each store might have one or several foundation stones, each bearing one name and the year. For example: "This stone laid by Raymond Montaque Burton 1937". The children were quite young when these stones were laid. Stanley Howard was born in 1914 and laid a stone for the Nottingham Beastmarket Hill store in 1924. At least six stores bear stones laid by Montague's wife "Lady Burton", and a number in the mid to late 1930s were laid by Austin Stephen Burton who may have been a grandchild.

Whilst some of these Burton buildings have been destroyed over the years, many are still standing and some of them still have active snooker clubs upstairs. Some were still occupied by Burton stores at the time of Arcadia's closure in 2020 (often a combined Burton and Dorothy Perkins store) but many others had changed use. McDonald's first three restaurants in the UK were opened in former Burton stores in 1974 and 1975 as the company was selling property at that time.

Most of the Scottish stores are listed with Historic Environment Scotland, protecting them from changes. However, only six stores in England and Wales are listed buildings, leaving over 200 with no protection from future changes or demolition. , stores have been demolished in Plymouth (2004) and Neasden (2012).

The first Dublin Burton's store was housed in the purpose-built Montague Burton Building on the corner of Dame Street and South Great George's Street. It is now on the city's list of protected structures.

Charitable activities

Burton has worked with the Bobby Moore Fund in order to publicize the issue of bowel cancer. England's World-Cup-winning football team captain Bobby Moore died of bowel cancer in 1993. The Bobby Moore Fund is an arm of Cancer Research UK.

In November 2009, Burton sought to bring back "The Burton", a style of moustache worn by founder Montague Burton, through their support of the Movember campaign in order to raise money for The Prostate Cancer Charity. The "Burton" moustache was styled upon two influential moustache types, the English and the Handlebar.

Notes

References

External links

 
 

1903 establishments in England
2021 disestablishments in England
2021 disestablishments in the United Kingdom
2021 mergers and acquisitions
British companies established in 1903
Clothing companies of England
Clothing companies based in London
Clothing companies established in 1903
Clothing retailers of England
Companies based in the City of Westminster
Companies formerly listed on the London Stock Exchange
Retail companies disestablished in 2021
Retail companies established in 1903
Companies that have entered administration in the United Kingdom
Companies that filed for Chapter 11 bankruptcy in 2019